The 2013 South American Basketball Championship for Women was the 33rd edition of the tournament. Eight teams featured the competition, held in Mendoza, Argentina from July 31 to August 4. Brazil was the defending champion and retain the title.

Preliminary round

Group A

Group B

Classification round

5th–8th classification

Seventh place game

Fifth place game

Final round

Semifinals

Third place game

Final

Final standings

References

External links
Official website

2013 in women's basketball
Women
2013 in Argentine women's sport
International women's basketball competitions hosted by Argentina
South American Basketball Championship for Women
July 2013 sports events in South America
August 2013 sports events in South America
Sport in Mendoza, Argentina